Marios Karapatakis (born 12 January 1951) is a Cypriot sailor. He competed in the Flying Dutchman event at the 1980 Summer Olympics.

References

External links
 

1951 births
Living people
Cypriot male sailors (sport)
Olympic sailors of Cyprus
Sailors at the 1980 Summer Olympics – Flying Dutchman
Place of birth missing (living people)